The Campeonato Nacional de Clubes (National Championship of Clubs) is an annual rugby union tournament contested by men's clubs in Venezuela. It is organised by the Venezuelan Rugby Federation. The competition began in 1976 with a match between the teams Rugby Club Caracas and Anaucos Rugby Club. Rugby Club Caracas won the match and became the champion in that year.

Format 
The championship has two stages: a group stage and a knockout stage. In the group stage, the teams are divided into geographical zones. Each team plays two matches against each of the other teams in the same group. The top two clubs of each zone qualify to the knockout stage. The knockout stage comprises three rounds of matches: quarter-finals, semi-finals, and the final.

Champions

See also 
 Rugby union in Venezuela

References

Rugby union in Venezuela
Rugby union tournaments for clubs